Louis and the Angels is a 1957 studio album by Louis Armstrong, of songs that refer to angels.

Reception

AllMusic awarded the album three stars and reviewer Scott Yanow said that "this obscure set by Louis Armstrong has its strange appeal. Satch gets off a few good trumpet solos and is quite cheerful throughout, even joking during "The Prisoner's Song" when the word "angel" finally shows up...Although more commercial than Armstrong's usual recordings of the era, this set is more memorable than one would expect and is worth searching for."

Track listing
 "When Did You Leave Heaven?" (Walter Bullock, Richard A. Whiting) – 3:42
 "You're a Heavenly Thing" (Jack Little, Joe Young) – 3:17
 "I Married an Angel" (Lorenz Hart, Richard Rodgers) – 3:40
 "A Sinner Kissed an Angel" (Mack David, Richard M. Jones, Ray Joseph) – 2:42
 "Angela Mia" (Lew Pollack, Erno Rapee) – 3:22
 "Angel Child" (Benny Davis, George Price, Abner Silver) – 2:54
 "And the Angels Sing" (Ziggy Elman, Johnny Mercer) – 3:23
 "Fools Rush In (Where Angels Fear to Tread)" (Rube Bloom, Mercer) – 3:32
 "I'll String Along With You" (Al Dubin, Harry Warren) – 3:05
 "Angel" (Peter DeRose, Mitchell Parish) – 3:40
 "The Prisoner's Song" (Guy Massey) – 3:12
 "Goodnight, Angel" (Herb Magidson, Allie Wrubel) – 2:51

Personnel
Louis Armstrong - trumpet, vocals
George Dorsey - alto saxophone, flute
Phil Urso - tenor saxophone
Lucky Thompson - tenor saxophone
Everett Barksdale - guitar 
George Barnes - guitar
Joe Benjamin - double bass
Sid Block - double bass
Dave McRae - baritone saxophone
Billy Kyle - piano
Rudy Taylor - drums 
Unknown harp
Unknown personnel - strings
Unknown personnel - choir 
Sy Oliver - arranger, conductor

References

Decca Records albums
Louis Armstrong albums
1957 albums
Albums arranged by Sy Oliver
Albums conducted by Sy Oliver